The Cuban slider (Trachemys decussata) is a species of turtle native to Cuba (including Isla de la Juventud), but has also been introduced to Grand Cayman and Cayman Brac in the Cayman Islands (where it is known as the taco river slider or hickatee), and Marie Galante in Guadeloupe.

Gallery

References

Trachemys
Endemic fauna of Cuba
Turtles of North America
Reptiles described in 1831
Taxa named by John Edward Gray